Trevor Lee is an Australian architect who has directed himself to energy issues in the built environment since his graduation with honours from the University of Melbourne in 1976. From 1985 to 1989, he was the "Senior Architect for Energy Management" of  Australia's  Department of Construction.  From 1989 until 1995 he served as editor of Solar Progress, the quarterly journal of the Australian and New Zealand Solar Energy Society, (ANZSES), and from 1996 to 1998 was honorary chair of that organisation.

Lee was also a founding Director and later Vice-President of the Sustainable Energy Industry Association which merged with kindred organisations in 2001 to become the Business Council For Sustainable Energy. From 1991 to 2003, he has also served as an executive Director of Australian Ethical Investment Ltd, manager of unit trust and superannuation funds now totalling over $400 million. Lee has been associated with Energy Strategies through their joint firm Energy Partners since 1990.

Trevor Lee is also co-author of the Australian Solar Radiation Data Handbook, which was fully revised in 2005.

See also

 Alan Pears
 Hugh Saddler
 Energy policy in Australia
 Renewable energy in Australia

References

External links
ANZSES
Energy Strategies
Solar Progress magazine

Australian activists
Living people
Solar building designers
Australian architects
University of Melbourne alumni
Sustainability advocates
Year of birth missing (living people)